A clan is a group of people united by kinship and descent. It may refer to:

 Clan (African Great Lakes), a unit of social organisation
 Chinese clan association, formed by Overseas Chinese based on dialect groups or family names
 Irish clan, an Irish family group with a common surname
 Japanese clans. a Japanese family  group with a common surname
 Scottish clan, a Scottish family group with a common surname

Clan(s) may also refer to:

Arts and entertainment
 Clans (BattleTech), in the fictional BattleTech universe
 Clans (board game), a prehistoric-themed German-style board game
 Clans (game), a 1999 action RPG.
 Clan (TV channel), a children- and youth-oriented Spanish TV channel.
 Clan (TV series), a Flemish TV series
 Clan (video gaming), a group of players who regularly play together in a multi-player game
 Glasgow Clan An ice hockey team from Glasgow, Scotland who compete in the Elite Ice Hockey League.

Other uses
 Clan (car), a British sports car manufacturer, producer of the Clan Crusader
 Clans, Alpes-Maritimes, a commune of the Alpes-Maritimes département in France
 Clans, Haute-Saône, a commune of the Haute-Saône département in France
 Clan Class, a Highland Railway steam locomotive
 Clan Line, a British shipping firm of the 19th and 20th centuries
 Protein clan, a superfamily of proteins, usually proteases
 Simon Fraser Clan, the varsity sport teams for Simon Fraser University
 The collective noun for hyenas

See also 
 The Clan (disambiguation)
 Clansman (disambiguation)
 Klan (disambiguation)
 Ku Klux Klan
 Llan (placename element)